Yamagata 1st district (山形県第1区, Yamagata-ken dai-ikku or simply 山形県第1区, Yamagata-ikku) is a single-member constituency of the House of Representatives in the Diet of Japan. It is located in Eastern Yamagata and covers the cities of Yamagata, Kaminoyama and Tendō and the county of Higashimurayama. As of 2012, 306,446 eligible voters were registered in the district.

Since its creation until 2012 , the district was mainly contested by Democrat Michihiko Kano (formerly Hata group, leading his own faction from August 2011, until the 1990s: LDP, Fukuda faction), agriculture minister in the realigned Kan cabinet, and Liberal Democrat Toshiaki Endō (Koga faction), former vice minister in the education and science ministry during the First Abe cabinet. Since 2012, Endō has held the seat.

List of representatives

Election results

References 

Politics of Yamagata Prefecture
Districts of the House of Representatives (Japan)